Bas-Sassandra District is one of fourteen administrative districts of Ivory Coast. The district is located in the southwest part of the country. The capital of the district is San-Pédro.

Creation
The district was created in a 2011 administrative reorganisation of the subdivisions of Ivory Coast. Its territory is composed of the former region of Bas-Sassandra with the addition of the department of Fresco, which was transferred from the region of Sud-Bandama.

Administrative divisions
Bas-Sassandra District is currently subdivided into three regions and the following departments: 
 Gbôklé Region (region seat in Sassandra)
 Fresco Department
 Sassandra Department
 Nawa Region (region seat in Soubré)
 Buyo Department
 Guéyo Department
 Méagui Department
 Soubré Department
 San-Pédro Region (region seat also in San-Pédro) 
 San-Pédro Department
 Tabou Department

Population
According to the 2021 census, Bas-Sassandra District has a population of 2,687,176.

References

 
Districts of Ivory Coast
States and territories established in 2011